WKKD may refer to:

 WKKD (AM), a defunct radio station in Aurora, Illinois
 WKKD-FM, the original call letters of WERV-FM